Judge Curran may refer to:

Edward Matthew Curran (1903–1988), judge of the United States District Court for the District of Columbia
Thomas John Curran (1924–2012), judge of the United States District Court for the Eastern District of Wisconsin